Bushmoor is a hamlet in Shropshire, England.

It is located in the parish of Wistanstow, 1¼ miles north of that village, and half a mile west of the A49 road.

The lane running into the village from Wistanstow is a Roman road, which ran between the Roman settlements and forts at Leintwardine and Wroxeter. The present day lane turns a sharp corner (to the east and the 
A49) off this ancient route and this is known as The Corner.

Hamlets in Shropshire